In finance, factor theory is a collection of related mathematical models that explain asset returns as driven by distinct economic risks called factors. In less formal usage, a factor is simply an attribute or collection of related attributes that explain an asset's returns.

The original factor model is the capital asset pricing model (CAPM), which predicts that an asset's expected return in excess of the risk-free rate is wholly determined by its exposure to the market factor. More formally, an asset's expected excess return is linearly related its co-movement with the market portfolio.

The most famous extension to the CAPM is the Fama–French three-factor model, which adds size and value factors to explain the cross-sectional returns of stocks. This extension was made due to the empirical failure of the CAPM.

See also 
Capital asset pricing model
Fama-French three-factor model
Carhart four-factor model

Mathematical finance